LÉ Eithne (P31) was a patrol vessel in service with the Irish Naval Service. The ship is named after Eithne, a tragic heroine and the daughter of the one-eyed Fomorian King, Balor in an early Irish romantic tale. Eithne was the flagship of the Irish Naval Service.

Eithne was originally built as a Helicopter Patrol Vessel for long-range fisheries patrol vessel, intended to be at sea for up to 30 days. She is the only ship in her class, as the other planned members of the Eithne-class were never built.

Design
Eithne was designed to carry a SA365F Dauphin helicopter, and was the only ship in the Irish Naval Service fleet to have a flight deck. Helicopter operations were limited primarily to the vessel's early years of service. These operations stopped in later years, due in part to the purchase of CASA CN235-100MP Persuader Maritime Patrol Aircraft and decommissioning of the Dauphin helicopters. The vessel was fitted with retractable fin stabilisers to reduce rolling during helicopter operations at sea.

Service

Eithne was the last ship of the Irish Naval Service to have been built in Ireland, constructed at Verolme Dockyard at Rushbrooke, County Cork and completed in 1984. Shipbuilding operations ceased at the yard in 1984, and the yard went into receivership.

In July 2005 LÉ Eithne represented Ireland at the International Fleet Review at Portsmouth, England.

In April–June 2006 Eithne travelled to Buenos Aires, Argentina, in the first-ever deployment of an Irish ship in the southern hemisphere, in order to participate in commemorations of the impending sesquicentenary of the death of Admiral William Brown who had been born in Ireland. The ship brought back a statue of Brown for display in Dublin.

In 2014, asbestos was found on the ship necessitating a clean-up.

In May 2015 Minister of Defence Simon Coveney announced the deployment of Eithne to the Mediterranean as part of the EU's ongoing rescue mission for migrants. Together with other Naval Service vessels, between 2015 and 2017 Eithne undertook a number of deployments in the Mediterranean, rescuing several hundred migrants as part of each mission.

In late 2018, the navigation systems onboard Eithne were upgraded to use a Warship Electronic Chart Display and Information System (WECDIS), reportedly making it the first vessel in the Naval Service fleet to "achieve paperless navigation".

The manner and messaging on the vessel's removal from service caused some controversy, as statements from the Minister of State at the Department of Defence Paul Kehoe (who suggested that the vessel was removed for "routine maintenance") contradicted previous statements made by Flag Officer Commander Mick Malone (who confirmed that the vessel would be tied-up "until adequate numbers of [..] personnel are available").

In March 2020, Eithne was returned to active service and deployed to Cork as part of Ireland's response to the coronavirus pandemic, alongside NSR personnel and Army engineers.

Decommissioning

Following her decommissioning, Cork County Council requested the transfer of Eithne to the city for preservation as a museum ship. In January 2023, it was reported that the Dublin Port company was also trying to secure the vessel for use as a museum ship in Dublin.

See also

References

External links

Defence Forces Ireland LÉ Eithne webpage

1983 ships
Ships built in Ireland
Naval ships of the Republic of Ireland